Mutshatsha is a town in the Democratic Republic of the Congo near the border with both Zambia and Angola.  It is the administrative center of the territory of the same name in Lualaba province.

Transport 
The town is served by a station on the Benguela railway.

See also 
 Railway stations in DRCongo
 Transport in the Democratic Republic of the Congo

References

External links 
 Maplandia

 Populated places in Lualaba Province